Heterogynis is a genus of moths of the Heterogynidae family.

Species
 Heterogynis penella (Hübner, 1819)
 Heterogynis canalensis Chapman, 1904
 Heterogynis paradoxa Rambur, 1837
 Heterogynis eremita Zilli, Cianchi, Racheli & Bullini, 1988
 Heterogynis andalusica Daniel, 1966
 Heterogynis thomas Zilli, 1987
 Heterogynis jellaba de Freina, 2003
 Heterogynis rifensis de Freina, 2003

References
 Heterogynis at Markku Savela's Lepidoptera and Some Other Life Forms

Heterogynidae
Zygaenoidea genera